The 2016 Southeastern Louisiana Lions football team represented Southeastern Louisiana University in the 2016 NCAA Division I FCS football season. The Lions were led by fifth-year head coach Ron Roberts and played their home games at Strawberry Stadium. They were a member of the Southland Conference. They finished the season 7–4, 7–2 in Southland play to finish in third place.

Previous season
The Lions finished the season 4–7, 3–6 in Southland play to finish in a three-way tie for eighth place.

Schedule
Source:

Game summaries

@ Oklahoma State

Sources:

@ Southern Utah

Sources:

Northwestern State

Sources:

@ Lamar

Sources:

McNeese State

Sources:

@ Stephen F. Austin

Sources:

Houston Baptist

Sources:

Central Arkansas

Sources:

@ Incarnate Word

Sources: Box Score

Abilene Christian

Sources:

@ Nicholls State

Sources:

References

Southeastern Louisiana
Southeastern Louisiana Lions football seasons
Southeastern Louisiana Lions football